Karambakkudi is a panchayat town as well as Taluk in Pudukkottai district in the Indian state of Tamil Nadu. Karambakkudi is located about 40 km from Thanjavur and 40 km from Pudukkottai. This town is located on the border of the Thanjavur and Pudukkottai district in Tamil Nadu. The opinion of the people of this area is that this area should become an assembly constituency very soon, Here all higher secondary schools and Art's college is there.This area is covered by Delta Region.

Demographics
According to the 2011 census, the taluk of Karambakudi had a population of 110,612 with 54,685  males and 55,927 females. There were 1023 women for every 1000 men. The taluk had a literacy rate of 66.16. Child population in the age group below 6 was 6,642 Males and 6,124 Females.

Religion
Three major religions (Hindu, Christianity and Islam) are practiced in Karambakkudi. The major churches, temples and many mosques are there.

Geography 

This area is in the protected agricultural zone of the Cauvery Delta. It has an average elevation of 36 metres (118 feet).

Climate
The climate of Karambakkudi town is hot and dry. Temperatures range between a maximum of 41 °C and a minimum of 18 °C. April to June are the hottest months and December and January are coldest with temperatures rising towards the end of February. Rainfall occurs mostly during the north-east monsoon in the months of October to December though the town receives little rainfall, averaging 840 mm compared to the district average. The period from November to February in Karambakkudi is pleasant, with a climate full of warm days and cool nights. The area was hit by Hurricane Gaja in 2018, when heavy rains caused severe damage to coconut trees.

Economy
The main source of income is agriculture. Paddy, groundnut and sugarcane are the major crops. Especially paddy income sources from some villages like Regunathapuram, Kulandhiranpattu, Thirumnanjeri, Pudupatti, Theethanviduthi, Ooranipuram, Neyveli, and Idayathi. Many people go abroad and working in Arabic and European countries.

Transport 
Karambakkudi is well connected by road to Thanjavur, Pudukkottai, Orathanadu, Pattukottai, Alangudi, Gandarvakottai, Tiruchirapalli, Chennai, Mannargudi, Peravurani, Erode, Karaikkudi and Aranthangi. Non-request bus services are available for these places by both private and public carriers. Karambakkudi had a single bus terminus located at the heart of the town. The nearest railway station is at Thanjavur, about 40 km away. The nearest airport is Tiruchirapalli Airport, about 75 km away.

Private and government transportation is regularly available from Karambakkudi to Chennai at night.

Education
Several schools and colleges are in Karambakkudi. Half of the peoples get their education from government and government-aided schools. There are many equipped private schools in and around the town.

 Panchayat union primary school, Anumarkovil
 Government Boys higher secondary school
 Government Girls higher secondary school
 TELC (Govt Aided) primary school
 Panchayat union primary school (Sengamalam)
 Guthoos Matriculation School
 Mahathma gandhi Nursery & Primary school
 Bright higher secondary school
 Vinayaga Vidyalaya Matriculation School
 Reena Mercy Matriculation school
 Vignesh Computer Education & Typewriting Institute Since 1997 - 2021 (Silver Jubilee)

Health
A  Government General Hospital is situated in the heart of the town.

References

Cities and towns in Pudukkottai district